Madanrting is a census town in East Khasi Hills district in the Indian state of Meghalaya.

Demographics
 India census, Madanrting had a population of 16,700. Males constitute 51% of the population and females 49%. Madanrting has an average literacy rate of 76%, higher than the national average of 59.5%: male literacy is 80%, and female literacy is 72%. In Madanrting, 13% of the population is under 6 years of age.

References

East Khasi Hills district
Cities and towns in East Khasi Hills district